Seven Mountains is the fourth album of Swiss folk rock and indie rock band 77 Bombay Street released 18 September 2015 after their self-financed independent album Dead Bird in 2009 and their two studio albums Up in the Sky in 2011 and Oko Town in 2012. The four Buchli brothers started writing the songs in Berline, Germany before moving to Australia to add new songs to the album. The album was recorded in Linear Recording Studios and produced by Chris Vallejo, its founder.

The single "Seven Mountains" was pre-released on 16 June 2015 in preparation for the launching of the album. The follow-up singles were "Once and Only" and "Bombay", all three accompanied by music videos.

The album reached the top of the Schweizer Hitparade, the official Swiss Albums Chart becoming their second consecutive chart topping release in Switzerland as the previous album Oko Town also made it to number 1. The album was certified platinum.

Track listing

Charts

Weekly charts

Year-end charts

References

2015 albums
77 Bombay Street albums